Pälkäne is a municipality of Finland. It is part of the Pirkanmaa region. Onkkaala is the administrative center of the municipality.

The municipality is unilingually Finnish. Many people from Helsinki and the surrounding cities own summer cottages and residences in Pälkäne, making the small town very busy during summer vacation seasons. Pälkäne is a very popular summer vacation resort given its diverse services, high-quality swimming beach, beautiful nature and close location to big cities.
From start of year 2007 Pälkäne and Luopioinen were merged to a new municipality of Pälkäne.

Geography

Nature
 
The landscape of Pälkäne is dominated by several lakes, the largest of which are Lake Mallasvesi on the west side of Onkkaala and Lake Pälkänevesi on its east side, as well as Lake Roine on the Kangasala side and Lake Ilmoilanselkä on the Hauho (Hämeenlinna) side. Lake Kukkia is situated in the area of the former municipality of Luopioinen. In the western part of Pälkäne, Roine and Mallasvesi are separated by the rather large island of Hausalo.

The Kostianvirta River, which belongs part to the drainage basin of the Kokemäki River, flows between Lake Pälkänevesi and Lake Mallasvesi. As the average water level of both lakes is about 84 meters above sea level, the flow direction of Kostianvirta sometimes changes, especially due to the spring meltwater.

Villages

 Äimälä
 Aitoo
 Ämmätsä
 Epaala
 Evinsalo
 Haltia
 Harhala
 Huhtioinen
 Huntila
 Kaitamo
 Kajantila
 Kankahainen
 Kantokylä
 Kantola
 Kärväntälä
 Karviala
 Kaukkala
 Kinnala
 Kirpu
 Kollola
 Kotila
 Kouvala
 Kuisema
 Kukkola
 Kuohijoki
 Kuuliala
 Kyynärö
 Laitikkala
 Lemmettylä
 Lovensalo
 Luikala
 Luopioinen
 Mälkilä
 Mällinoja
 Miemola
 Mustilahti
 Myttäälä
 Okerla
 Oksala
 Onkkaala
 Padankoski
 Pappila
 Pitkäjärvi
 Pohjalahti
 Puutikkala
 Rautajärvi
 Ruokola
 Ruotsila
 Sairiala
 Salmentaka
 Sappee
 Säynäjärvi
 Seitsye
 Tauriala
 Tausti
 Tommola
 Töyräniemi
 Vahdermetsä
 Vuolijoki

Culture

Food
In the 1980s, Pälkäne's traditional parish dishes were called local sweetened potato casserole called tuuvinki, salted bream, slowly smoked meat, Tavastian limppu bread called varikoinen, sweet sahti, and plum kissel.

People
 Matti Helenius-Seppälä (1870–1920)
 August Hyöki (1874–1960)
 Eemil Linna (1876–1951)
 Väinö Sipilä (1897–1987)
 Toivo Salonen (born 1933)
 Mikko Leppilampi (born 1978)
 Riku Helenius (born 1988)

See also
 Battle of Pälkäne

References

External links

Municipality of Pälkäne – Official website

 
Populated places established in 1866
1866 establishments in the Russian Empire